Craig Moss (born ) is an English former rugby league footballer who played in the 2000s and 2010s.

Background
Craig Moss was born in Pontefract, West Yorkshire, England.

Playing career
Craig Moss made his début for Featherstone Rovers on Sunday 28 March 2004, and he played his last match for Featherstone Rovers during the 2007–season, as in March 2007, he received a two-year ban after testing positive for the performance-enhancing substance 17-epimethandienone. He returned to the sport in 2009, signing for Hunslet. He then joined Keighley a year later.

References

1984 births
Living people
English rugby league players
Featherstone Rovers players
Hunslet R.L.F.C. players
Keighley Cougars players
Rugby league fullbacks
Rugby league players from Pontefract
Wales national rugby league team players